Kevin B. Sullivan (born August 20, 1949) is an American politician. A Democrat, he was the 106th Lieutenant Governor of Connecticut, from 2004 to 2007. He was elected to the Connecticut State Senate in 1986 and served as Senate President Pro Tempore from 1997 to 2004.

Mayor
Prior to his election to the State Senate, he was mayor of West Hartford, Connecticut, serving on the Town Council for five years.  As Mayor, he oversaw an executive reorganization of town government, land use changes that eventually led to the economic renewal of the town center and cut property taxes.

State Senator
Elected to the State Senate in 1986, Sullivan chaired the General Assembly's Education Committee.  Connecticut Magazine cited him for his honesty and hard work.  After serving as Assistant Minority Leader, Sullivan became State Senate President Pro Tempore in 1997 and chaired the national Senate President's Forum.

Lieutenant Governor
Upon Governor John G. Rowland's resignation and imprisonment, Lieutenant Governor M. Jodi Rell became governor. Sullivan, as the Senate President Pro Tempore, succeeded to the office of Lieutenant Governor in 2004 where he served until 2007.  During his time as Lieutenant governor, he led a statewide effort to improve mental health care.

Commissioner of Revenue Services
In 2011, Governor Dannel Malloy appointed Sullivan as Connecticut's Commissioner of Revenue Service.  He also served as President of the national Federation of Tax Administrators.

References

External links
 Official site
 

Living people
People from West Hartford, Connecticut
Mayors of places in Connecticut
Presidents pro tempore of the Connecticut Senate
Democratic Party Connecticut state senators
Lieutenant Governors of Connecticut
Trinity College (Connecticut) alumni
University of Connecticut School of Law alumni
Quinnipiac University faculty
1949 births